Toda's theorem is a result in computational complexity theory that was proven by Seinosuke Toda in his paper "PP is as Hard as the Polynomial-Time Hierarchy" and was given the 1998 Gödel Prize.

Statement
The theorem states that the entire polynomial hierarchy PH is contained in PPP; this implies a closely related statement, that PH is contained in P#P.

Definitions
#P is the problem of exactly counting the number of solutions to a polynomially-verifiable question (that is, to a question in NP), while loosely speaking, PP is the problem of giving an answer that is correct more than half the time. The class P#P consists of all the problems that can be solved in polynomial time if you have access to instantaneous answers to any counting problem in #P (polynomial time relative to a #P oracle). Thus Toda's theorem implies that for any problem in the polynomial hierarchy there is a deterministic polynomial-time Turing reduction to a counting problem.

An analogous result in the complexity theory over the reals (in the sense of Blum–Shub–Smale real Turing machines) was proved by Saugata Basu and Thierry Zell in 2009 and a complex analogue of Toda's theorem was proved by Saugata Basu in 2011.

Proof
The proof is broken into two parts.

 First, it is established that
 

The proof uses a variation of Valiant–Vazirani theorem. Because  contains  and is closed under complement, it follows by induction that .

 Second, it is established that
 

Together, the two parts imply

References

Structural complexity theory
Theorems in computational complexity theory